Stockton-Montmorency is a historic house at 1700 Walnut Green Road in Greenville, Delaware. This elegant brick Colonial Revival house, originally just called "Stockton", was designed by William Lawrence Bottomley and built in 1937 for Helen Page Echols and Angus Echols. The house was purchased in the 1960s by Henry E. I. du Pont, who added "Montmorency" to its name.

The house was listed on the National Register of Historic Places in 2012.

See also
National Register of Historic Places listings in northern New Castle County, Delaware

References

Houses on the National Register of Historic Places in Delaware
Federal architecture in Delaware
Houses completed in 1937
Houses in New Castle County, Delaware
Du Pont family residences
National Register of Historic Places in New Castle County, Delaware